The Joint Association of Boxers is an attempt to unionize professional boxers, who are often called "the most exploited athletes."  The union's stated goals are: 

   To protect the rights of boxers and ensure full disclosure of finances under the Muhammad Ali Boxing Reform Act;
 To ensure the highest possible safety standards at all matches;
 To create health and pension benefit plans for boxers;
 To create a minimum salary scale;
 To ensure fair distribution of fight proceeds between boxers and promoters; and
 To assist boxers in their transition from boxing to other jobs upon retirement.

The initial meeting of the JAB took place in Las Vegas on May 12, 2003, where the union was founded in cooperation with the International Brotherhood of Teamsters.  Well-known boxers that are members include David Tua, Joel Casamayor, and the late Diego Corrales.

References

Trade unions established in 2003
Sports organizations established in 2003
Sports trade unions